The World XI, also known as the FIFA World Stars, is an association football team consisting of players from various countries. The World XI play one-off games against clubs, national teams, collectives of continental teams.

The official first match of the FIFA World XI was held against England on the 100th anniversary of the Football Association – 23 October 1963. The World lost 2–1 in front of a crowd of 100,000. Prior to this, matches had been played in 1947 against the United Kingdom in Scotland (to celebrate the four British national teams returning to FIFA, with the proceeds going to the world governing body) and against England in 1953 (for the Football Association's 90th anniversary – in fact all the players were from continental Europe).

FIFA has organised several World XI squads to compete in various commemorative exhibitions and charity testimonials, but in its own documentation, the only official World Stars Games listed are those against national, pan-continental or representative teams; its matches against club teams including New York Cosmos, Hamburger SV, Benfica, Anderlecht, Flamengo, Barcelona, Manchester United and Real Madrid are not included. On 18 July 2007, the World XI faced an Africa XI with both teams unusually composed of retired players. 

The Women's World XI first played on 14 February 1999 at Spartan Stadium in San Jose, California, United States, for the draw of the 1999 FIFA Women's World Cup, defeating the United States 2–1.

Results

Centenary of the (English) Football Association

65th Birthday of Ricardo Zamora 

10th Anniversary of Brazil's first World Cup victory (1958)

Farewell game for Garrincha 

1st Anniversary of Argentina's first World Cup victory (1978)

FIFA Charity Match for UNICEF 

FIFA Charity Match for UNICEF

FIFA Charity Match for UNICEF

FIFA Charity Match for SOS Children's Villages

Hong Kong Reunification Cup 

Russian Football Centennial Match

FIFA Charity Match for SOS Children's Villages

75th Anniversary of the founding of the Turkish Republic and the Turkish Football Federation 

Centenary of the FIGC (Italian Football Federation)

Official Opening of the Olympic Stadium Australia

Farewell game for Nelson Mandela

"Football For Peace"

Charity Match for SOS Children's Villages

Football for Hope (Indian Ocean Tsunami funds)

Players

Unofficial games

Farewell game for Zico 

Pelé's 50th Birthday

Kobe Earthquake Benefit Match

World Dream Soccer Exhibition

Farewell game for Diego Maradona

Legends' games

Reunification Cup - celebration of the 10th Anniversary of Hong Kong's reunification with China

 
90 Minutes for Mandela

Women's games

First ever women's World Stars match played to coincide with the official draw for the 1999 FIFA Women's World Cup USA

FIFA Centennial Match

Match played to coincide with the official draw for the FIFA Women's World Cup China 2007

See also
 Football for Hope

Notes

References

Football combination XI teams
Association football clubs established in 1963